Mallu Adil Shah, of the Adil Shahi dynasty, was the king of the Bijapur Sultanate of modern-day southern India. He ruled for a short period in 1534, before being deposed and blinded.

Reign 
Mallu Adil Shah succeeded his father Ismail Adil Shah's death. He was supposed to be in the company of evil habits. Punji Khatun, Mallu Adil Shah's paternal grand mother with the help of General Asad Khan deposed Mallu Adil Shah and declared his younger brother Ibrahim Adil Shah I as the king.

References

 A Visit to Bijapur by H. S. Kaujalagi
 "Avalokana" a souvenir published by the Government of Karnataka
 Centenary Souvenir published by the Bijapur Municipal Corporation
 Wakiyate Mumlikate Bijapur by Basheeruddin Dahalwi
 Tareekhe Firishta by Muhammad Kasim Firishta
 Shawahidul Awliyae Bijapur by Sayyad Murtuza Quadri Gachi Mahal

16th-century Indian monarchs
16th-century Indian Muslims
Sultans of Bijapur
Adil Shahi dynasty